Pizzoccheri are a type of short tagliatelle, a flat ribbon pasta, made with 80% buckwheat flour and 20% wheat flour. They are believed to have originated in Valtellina, a small valley in Lombardy in Northern Italy.

Pizzoccheri can be made by hand or can be purchased pre-made; however, if Pizzoccheri are prepared at home, they must generally be eaten the same day.

History
The dish was first identified in 1550, in the Category of Inventories of Things that May be Eaten in Italy by Ortensio Lando.

In the 1799 book Die Republik Graubündent (The Republic of Graubünden), German historian Heinrich L. Lehmann wrote about a "perzockel" dough made from buckwheat flour and egg.

In popular culture
Two pizzoccheri fairs (or sagre) take place in Teglio: La Sagra dei Pizzoccheri, celebrated annually in July and the festival of The Golden Pizzocchero, celebrated annually in September.

In 2002, the Accademia del Pizzocchero di Teglio was founded to promote traditional preparations of pizzocchero.

In 2016, the dish gained the European Union's recognition of Protected Geographical Indication (IGP).

Variations
Pizzoccheri della Valtellina, the original variation from Valtellina, are cooked along with greens (often Swiss Chard but also Savoy cabbage), and cubed potatoes. This mixture is layered with pieces of Valtellina Casera cheese and ground Grana Padano or Parmigiano Reggiano, and dressed with garlic lightly fried in butter.

Pizzoccheri bianchi, from the area around Chiavenna, are quite distinct, being a form of gnocchetti, often made from white wheat flour and dry bread.

References

Culture of Graubünden
Cuisine of Lombardy
Italian products with protected designation of origin
Swiss cuisine
Types of pasta